Jodi-Ann Ward (born 1 September 1994) is a Jamaican netball player who plays in the Australian Suncorp Super Netball league for the Collingwood Magpies. She has also represented the Jamaica at an international level since 2017.

Career
Ward made her international debut in late 2017 against Barbados at the age of 22. She was also selected for the Jamaican netball team to take part at the 2018 Commonwealth Games. She was a key member of the Jamaican squad which stunned New Zealand in the bronze medal match as a part of the 2018 Commonwealth Games. As of October 2019 she has attained 25 test caps.

Ward has played domestic netball in several countries. Her career began in the Jamaican elite league for St. Catherine Racers in 2017, before she was signed by UK Netball Superleague club the Severn Stars ahead of the 2019 season. Ward played in England for one year before being signed by the Collingwood Magpies for the 2020 Australian season.

References 

1994 births
Living people
Jamaican netball players
Netball players at the 2018 Commonwealth Games
Commonwealth Games bronze medallists for Jamaica
Commonwealth Games medallists in netball
Netball Superleague players
Collingwood Magpies Netball players
2019 Netball World Cup players
Jamaican expatriate netball people in Australia
Jamaican expatriate netball people in England
Severn Stars players
Medallists at the 2018 Commonwealth Games
Medallists at the 2022 Commonwealth Games